Regional elections were held in the Czech Republic to elect the Regional Councils in 13 regions (all except Prague) on 17 and 18 October 2008. The elections were won by the opposition Czech Social Democratic Party (ČSSD), which won in every region.

Results

References

2008
2008 elections in the Czech Republic
October 2008 events in Europe